Piet Lagarde (born 9 December 1939) is a Dutch footballer. He played in two matches for the Netherlands national football team in 1962.

References

1939 births
Living people
Dutch footballers
Netherlands international footballers
Place of birth missing (living people)
Association footballers not categorized by position